Constituencies in Singapore are electoral divisions which may be represented by single or multiple seats in the Parliament of Singapore. Constituencies are classified as either Single Member Constituencies (SMCs) or Group Representation Constituencies (GRCs). SMCs are single-seat constituencies but GRCs have between four and five seats in Parliament.

Group Representation Constituencies

Group Representation Constituencies (GRCs) are a type of electoral constituency unique to Singaporean politics. GRCs are multi-member constituencies which are contested by teams of candidates from one party - or from independents. In each GRC, at least one candidate or Member of Parliament must be from a minority race: either a Malay, Indian or Other.

In 1988, the ruling People's Action Party (PAP) amended the Parliamentary Elections Act to create GRCs. The current Act enables the President, acting on the advice of the Prime Minister, to create a GRC from three to six electoral wards. In creating GRCs the President is advised by the Elections Department. The initial maximum size for GRCs was three candidates, but this has subsequently been increased, to four in 1991, and between 1997 and 2020, six. Since the 2020 elections, the number of candidates in a GRC decreased to a rule of five.

GRCs operate with a plurality voting system, voting by party slate, meaning that the party with a majority of votes combined from all divisions regardless of how many divisions voted for a majority will wins the allocated seats by block for the GRC. Until 2011, all Singaporean GRCs have had a PAP base.

The official justification for GRCs is to allow minority representation. Former Prime Minister Goh Chok Tong argued that the introduction of GRCs was necessary to ensure that Singapore's Parliament would continue to be multiracial in its composition and representation.  Opposition parties have criticized GRCs as making it even more difficult for non-PAP candidates to be elected to Parliament. The money required to contest a GRC is considerable as each candidate is required to pay a deposit ranging from S$4,000 to S$16,000 (the recent election is S$13,500).  This means that contesting a GRC is very costly for opposition parties. The presence of Cabinet Ministers in GRCs is often believed to give the PAP a considerable advantage in the contesting of a GRC. The PAP has used this tactic to its advantage on several occasions. Rather than stand in an uncontested GRC, in 1997, then-Prime Minister Goh Chok Tong shifted his attention to campaigning for candidates where the PAP believed they were most vulnerable, which was the Cheng San GRC. The opposition has charged the government with gerrymandering due to the changing of GRC boundaries at very short notice (see below section on electoral boundaries).

Critics have noted that Joshua Benjamin Jeyaratnam won the 1981 Anson by-election in a Chinese-majority constituency, and that since the GRC system was implemented, minority representation in Parliament has actually declined.

Boundaries and gerrymandering allegations
The boundaries of electoral constituencies in Singapore are decided by the Elections Department, which is under the control of the Prime Minister's Office.  Electoral boundaries are generally announced close to elections, usually a few days before the election itself is announced.  There have been accusations of gerrymandering regarding the redrawing of electoral boundaries and the dissolving of constituencies that return a high percentage of votes for parties other than the ruling PAP.

One of the cases that is often cited as evidence for gerrymandering in Singapore is the case of the Cheng San Group Representation Constituency (GRC). In the 1997 Singaporean general election, the Cheng San GRC was contested by the PAP and the Workers' Party of Singapore (WP). The final results were close, with the PAP winning with 53,553 votes (54.8%) to the WP's 44,132 votes (45.2%). Cheng San GRC had since dissolved thereafter following the 2001 General Elections. Despite the disadvantages assumed by the opposition party in Singapore, WP was successful in taking over a GRC (Aljunied GRC) during the 2011 General Elections and later Sengkang GRC in the 2020 General Elections.

Current Electoral Map (2020–present)
As of the revision of the electorates on 15 April 2020, the number of electors in the latest Registers of Electors is 2,653,942.

Group Representation Constituencies

Single Member Constituencies

See also
Past Singaporean electoral divisions
General elections in Singapore

References

External links
Constituency Boundaries Map, Parliament of Singapore.
Electoral boundaries Map, The Straits Times.

Singapore
 Constituencies